Anthony II, Count of Ligny (d. 8 February 1557) was a son of Count Charles I and his wife Charlotte of Estouteville.  In 1530, he succeeded his father as count of Ligny and Brienne.

In 1535, he married Margaret, a daughter of René of Savoy, Count of Villars.  They had the following children:
 John III (d. 1576)
 Francis, Duke of Piney-Luxembourg
 Anthony (d. 1573)
 Henry
 Madeleine (d. 1588), married Christophe Jouvenel des Ursins. Marquis de Traînel

Year of birth unknown
1557 deaths
Counts of Ligny
Counts of Brienne
House of Luxembourg
16th-century French nobility